Brian Riley was a New Zealand international rugby league footballer.

He was born on January 19, 1915, to Elizabeth (1874-1928) and Oliver Nathaniel Riley (1871-1952). His older brother Lawrence Leonard Riley (known by Leonard) played for Ponsonby United also, and was captain of the senior side. He was still playing when Brian debuted in 1933 at the age of 18 with Leonard aged 28. He also had an older sister, Rene Ruth Riley who was born in 1906. His first match for Ponsonby was against City Rovers at Carlaw Park on July 1.

Riley was Ponsonby's second highest try scorer in their first three decades with 57 tries from 1933 to 1942, only behind Arthur Kay with 71.

Personal life and death
Brian Riley married Valdora 'Val' Peace Matthews (1918-1999) and they had one son, Terrence William Riley (1945-2020).

References

Date of birth missing
Date of death missing
New Zealand rugby league players
New Zealand national rugby league team players
Auckland rugby league team players
Ponsonby Ponies players
Rugby league centres